Feridun Ahmed Bey (died 16 March 1583) was an influential Ottoman official, bureaucrat, author and military officer, best known for his service in the government of Grand Vizier Sokollu Mehmed Pasha (1565–1579). He was the second husband of Ayşe Hümaşah Sultan, granddaughter of Sultan Suleiman the Magnificent. The Münșeâtu's-Selâtin is his most important work, a two-volume compilation going back to early Islamic periods. According to Selcuk Aksin Somel, this work is "crucial for the study of early and classical periods of Ottoman history".

Biography
Feridun Ahmed Bey's date of birth is unknown. According to his own writings, he was born to a certain Abdülkadır (ʿAbd al-Qādir). Feridun Ahmed Bey was probably of devshirme origin. He was a protégé of Sokollu Mehmed Pasha and was reputable at the Siege of Szigetvár in 1566. He served as secretary of state (Reis ül-Küttab) from 1570 to 1573, and as chancellor (Nişancı) from 1573 to 1576. Following the ascension of Murad III (1574–1595), Sokollu Mehmed Pasha's power dwindled, and so did Feridun Ahmed Bey's. In the subsequent period he was sent to serve under the sanjakbeys of Smederevo and Köstendil. In 1581, he was recalled to Constantinople and was reappointed as Nişancı. Feridun Ahmed Bey died on 16 March 1583.

Notes

References

Sources
 
 
 

Year of birth unknown
1583 deaths
Devshirme
16th-century writers from the Ottoman Empire
Reis ül-Küttab
Nişancı
16th-century Ottoman military personnel